Centro Storico is the first urban zone of Rome, identified by the initials 1A. It belongs to the Municipio I and it includes the main part of the city center.

Geography
Centro Storico extends, to varying degrees, over the rioni of R. II Trevi, R. III Colonna, R. IV Campo Marzio, R. V Ponte, R. VI Parione, R. VII Regola, R. VIII Sant'Eustachio, R. IX Pigna and R. XI Sant'Angelo.

The area borders:
 to the north with the urban zones 17A Prati, 2C Flaminio and 2X Villa Borghese
 to the east with the urban zones 1F XX Settembre, 1E Esquilino and 1X Zona archeologica
 to the south with the urban zone 1C Aventino
 to the southwest with the urban zone 1B Trastevere

References

Urban zones of Rome
Rome R. II Trevi
Rome R. III Colonna
Rome R. IV Campo Marzio
Rome R. V Ponte
Rome R. VI Parione
Rome R. VII Regola
Rome R. VIII Sant'Eustachio
Rome R. IX Pigna
Rome R. XI Sant'Angelo
Historic districts